Private Equity International (PEI) is a global insight, analysis and data provider for the private equity industry, with a core focus on the relationship between investors and fund managers: the LP-GP nexus.

Launched in December 2001, the title's website and printed magazines cover the people, funds, capital providers and financial trends shaping the private equity industry with an integrated team of specialist journalists and researchers in London, Hong Kong and New York. As demand for private equity in institutional portfolios continues to grow around the world, PEI aims to deliver private equity-focused professionals a comprehensive offering of proprietary data, authoritative analysis and context around industry issues and best practice.

It is known for its annual ranking of the industry's largest private equity groups, the PEI 300, which measures firms by capital raised ("dry powder" in industry terms) over a 5-year period.

Private Equity International is published by London-headquartered PEI Group, which connects alternative investment practitioners with value-added information and analysis via its 16 different publications, and with each other via marquee industry events. It has offices in London, New York, Hong Kong, Tokyo, Sydney and Los Angeles.

References

External links
 Official website
 About Private Equity International
 The PEI 300: The world's largest private equity firms
 PEI Group

Business magazines published in the United Kingdom
Monthly magazines published in the United Kingdom
Magazines published in London
Magazines established in 2001